The 1969 San Diego Padres season was the inaugural season in franchise history. They joined the National League along with the Montreal Expos via the 1969 Major League Baseball expansion. In their inaugural season, the Padres went 52–110 (the same record as their expansion counterpart), finishing last in the National League's newly created Western Division, 41 games behind the division champion Atlanta Braves. The Padres finished last in the majors as a team in runs scored (468), hits (1,203) and batting average (.225).

Offseason

Expansion draft

The 1968 MLB expansion draft was held on October 14, 1968. Below is a list of players drafted by the Padres. "Pick" refers to the overall draft position of a pick.

Other transactions
 December 3, 1968: Dave Giusti was traded by the Padres to the St. Louis Cardinals for Ed Spiezio, Danny Breeden, Ron Davis and Phil Knuckles (minors).
 March 28, 1969: Ron Davis and Bobby Klaus were traded by the Padres to the Pittsburgh Pirates for Chris Cannizzaro and Tommie Sisk.

1968 MLB June amateur draft 
The Padres and Montreal Expos, along with the two American League expansion teams set to debut in 1969, the Kansas City Royals and Seattle Pilots, were allowed to participate in the June 1968 MLB first-year player draft, although the new teams were barred from the lottery's first three rounds. The Padres drafted only 16 players in the 1968 June draft, and of the players the Padres were able to sign, one (outfielder Dave Robinson) reached the major leagues.

Regular season

The first game

Scorecard
April 8, San Diego Stadium, San Diego, California

Batting

Pitching

Season standings

Record vs. opponents

Notable transactions
 April 14, 1969: Chris Krug was signed as a free agent by the Padres.
 April 17, 1969: Al McBean was traded by the Padres to the Los Angeles Dodgers for Tommy Dean and Leon Everitt.
 April 25, 1969: Dick Selma was traded by the Padres to the Chicago Cubs for Joe Niekro, Frankie Libran and Gary Ross.
 May 22, 1969: Bill Davis and Jerry DaVanon were traded by the Padres to the St. Louis Cardinals for John Sipin and Sonny Ruberto.
 May 23, 1969: Chris Krug was released by the Padres.
 June 13, 1969: Tony González was traded by the Padres to the Atlanta Braves for Van Kelly, Walt Hriniak and Andy Finlay (minors).

Draft picks
 June 5, 1969: 1969 Major League Baseball draft
Randy Elliott was drafted by the Padres in the 1st round (24th pick).
Doug DeCinces was drafted by the Padres in the 18th round, but did not sign.

Roster

Player stats

Batting

Starters by position
Note: Pos = Position; G = Games played; AB = At bats; R = Runs scored; H = Hits; Avg. = Batting average; HR = Home runs; RBI = Runs batted in; SB = Stolen bases

Other batters
Note: G = Games played; AB = At bats; R = Runs scored; H = Hits; Avg. = Batting average; HR = Home runs; RBI = Runs batted in; SB = Stolen bases

Pitching

Starting pitchers
Note: G = Games pitched; IP = Innings pitched; W = Wins; L = Losses; ERA = Earned run average; SO = Strikeouts

Other pitchers
Note: G = Games pitched; IP = Innings pitched; W = Wins; L = Losses; ERA = Earned run average; SO = Strikeouts

Relief pitchers
Note: G = Games pitched; W = Wins; L = Losses; SV = Saves; ERA = Earned run average; SO = Strikeouts

Award winners

1969 Major League Baseball All-Star Game
 Chris Cannizzaro, catcher, reserve

Farm system

Elmira affiliation shared with Kansas City Royals

References

External links
 1969 San Diego Padres at Baseball Reference
 1969 San Diego Padres at Baseball Almanac

San Diego Padres seasons
San Diego Padres season
Inaugural Major League Baseball seasons by team
San Diego Padres